Cheltenham Town are an English football club, formed in 1887. After several decades in local football, they joined the Birmingham Combination in 1932–33, moving to the Southern League Western Section in 1935–36.

Birmingham Combination history

Southern League history

Football League system history

Notes

References
Cheltenham Town at the Football Club History Database

Seasons
 
Cheltenham Town